The Diccionario panhispánico de dudas (Pan-Hispanic Dictionary of Doubts) or DPD is an elaborate work undertaken by the Real Academia Española (RAE – Royal Spanish Academy) and the Association of Spanish Language Academies with the goal of resolving questions related to the proper use of the Spanish language. Like other publications of the academy, such as the Diccionario de la lengua española de la Real Academia Española, the work follows a linguistically prescriptive philosophy as opposed to a descriptive one. The first edition was published in 2005 and is now being revised to more properly align with principles set forth by the academy's other publications.

The project was begun in response to the 50,000 questions received yearly by the constituent members of the Association of Spanish Language Academies.

It is composed of:

 The dictionary itself
 A set of five appendices covering conjugation of verbs, abbreviations, symbols that can be ordered alphabetically, other symbols, and demonyms
 A glossary of linguistic terminology
 A list of works cited

References

External links
 Diccionario panhispánico de dudas (1st edition, October 2005) at the RAE web site.

Spanish dictionaries
2005 non-fiction books